This is a list of encyclopedias and encyclopedic/biographical dictionaries published on the subject of business, information and information technology, economics and businesspeople in any language. Entries are in the English language except where noted.

General business

Becker, William H. The Encyclopedia of American Business History and Biography. Facts on File/Bruccoli Clark Layman, 1988–.

Business leader profiles for students. Gale Research, 1999–2002. .
Carey, Charles W., Ian C. Friedman. American inventors, entrepreneurs, and business visionaries. Facts On File, 2010. .

Encyclopedia of Business. Gale Research, 1994.

Fucini, Joseph J., Suzy Fucini. Entrepreneurs, the men and women behind famous brand names and how they made it. G.K. Hall, 1985. .

Gelbert, Doug. So who the heck was Oscar Mayer? Barricade Books, 1996. .
Gove, John. Made in America: the true stories behind the brand names that built a nation. Berkley Books, 2001. .
Grace's Guide to British Industrial History

Hamilton, Neil A. American business leaders: From colonial times to the present. ABC-CLIO, 1999. .
Hirahara, Naomi. Distinguished Asian American business leaders. Greenwood Press, 2003. .
Ingham, John N., Lynne B. Feldman. Contemporary American business leaders: a biographical dictionary. Greenwood Press, 1990. .

Krismann, Carol. Encyclopedia of American women in business: from colonial times to the present. Greenwood Press, 2005. .
MacCusker, John J. History of world trade since 1450. Macmillan Reference USA, 2006. .
Marquis Who's Who. Who's who in finance and business. (formerly Who's who in finance and industry. Marquis Who's Who, 1936–. .
Miller, William J. Encyclopedia of International Commerce. Cornell Maritime Press, 1985. 
Northrup, Cynthia Clark. Encyclopedia of world trade: from ancient times to the present. Sharpe Reference, 2005. .
Olson, James S. and Susan Wladaver-Morgan. Dictionary of United States Economic History. Greenwood, 1992.
Porter, Glenn. Encyclopedia of American Economic History: Studies of the Principal Movements and Ideas. Scribner's, 1980.
Presner, Lewis A. The International Business Directory and Reference. Wiley, 1991.

Schlager, Neil, Schlager Group. International directory of business biographies. St. James Press, 2005. .
Sherrow, Victoria. A to Z of American women business leaders and entrepreneurs. Facts on File, 2002. .

Standard and Poor's register of corporations, directors, and executives. Standard and Poor's. .

Accounting and finance
Pescow, Jerome. Encyclopedia of Accounting Systems. rev. ed., Prentice-Hall, 1976.
Shim, Jae K. and Joel G. Siegel. Encyclopedic Dictionary of Accounting and Finance. Prentice-Hall, 1989.

Banking and finance
Munn, Glenn G. and F. L. Garcia and Charles J. Woelfel. Encyclopedia of Banking and Finance. 9th ed., St. James Press, 1991.
Thorndike, David. The Thorndike Encyclopedia of Banking and Financial Tables. 3rd ed., Warren, Gorham, & Lamont, 1987.

Economics
Arestis, Philip, Malcolm C. Sawyer. A biographical dictionary of dissenting economists. E. Elgar, 2000. .
Blang, Mark, Howard R. Vane. Who's who in economics. Edward Elgar Publ., 2003. .
Blaug, Mark. Great economists since Keynes: an introduction to the lives and works of one hundred modern economists. Edward Elgar, 1998. .
Cicarelli, James, Julianne Cicarelli. Distinguished women economists. Greenwood Press, 2003. .
Eatwell, John. The New Palgrave: A Dictionary of Economics. Stockton Press, 1987. 
Greenwald, Douglas. McGraw-Hill Encyclopedia of Economics. 2nd ed., McGraw-Hill, 1994. 
 Henderson, David R. Fortune Encyclopedia of Economics. Warner, 1993. 
Pressman, Steven. Fifty major economists. Routledge, 2014. .
Rutherford, Donald. The biographical dictionary of British economists. Thoemmes, 2004. .

Insurance
Singer, Isidore. International insurance encyclopedia. American encyclopedic library assoc., 1910.

Labor
Filipelli, Ronald L. Labor Conflict in the United States: An Encyclopedia. Garland, 1990.
Jones, Lawrence K. Encyclopedia of Career Change and Work Issues. Oryx, 1992.

Management
Finch, Frank. Facts on File Encyclopedia of Management Techniques. Facts on File, 1985.
Heyel, Carl. The Encyclopedia of Management. 3rd ed., Van Nostrand, 1982.
Witzel, Morgan. Biographical dictionary of management. Thoemmes, 2001. .
Witzel, Morgen. The encyclopedia of the history of American management. Thoemmes Continuum, 2005. .

Money
Newman, Peter. The New Palgrave Dictionary of Money and Finance. Stockton Press, 1992.

Real estate
Arnold Encyclopedia of Real Estate. Warren, Gorham, & Lamont, 1978.  
Gross, Jerome. Webster's New World Illustrated Encyclopedic Dictionary of Real Estate. 3rd ed., Prentice Hall, 1987.  
Newell, James. The St. James Encyclopedia of Mortgage & Real Estate. St. James Press, 1991.

Statistics
International Encyclopedia of Statistics. Free Press, 1978. 
Kotz, Samuel and Norman L. Johnson. Encyclopedia of Statistical Sciences. Wiley, 1982–88. 
Sills, David L., ed. International Encyclopedia of the Social Sciences. Free Press, 1968.

Tourism

See also 
 Bibliography of encyclopedias

Citations

References
Guide to Reference.  American Library Association. Retrieved 5 December 2014. (subscription required).
Kister, Kenneth F. (1994). Kister's Best Encyclopedias (2nd ed.). Phoenix: Oryx. .
Kroeger, Alice Bertha, Isadore Gilbert Mudge. (1911). Guide to the Study and Use of Reference books. Chicago: American Library Association.

Business
Business books
 Bib